Ricardo Ojeda Lara was the defending champion but chose not to defend his title.

Filip Horanský won the title after defeating Jan Choinski 6–7(7–9), 6–3, 6–3 in the final.

Seeds

Draw

Finals

Top half

Bottom half

References
Main Draw
Qualifying Draw

Meerbusch Challenger - Singles
2018 Singles